Karl Pedersen (23 January 1902 – 7 October 1988) was a Norwegian wrestler. He competed in the men's Greco-Roman lightweight at the 1928 Summer Olympics.

References

External links
 

1902 births
1988 deaths
Norwegian male sport wrestlers
Olympic wrestlers of Norway
Wrestlers at the 1928 Summer Olympics
Sportspeople from Oslo
20th-century Norwegian people